Pieter Henket (born January 21, 1979) is a Dutch photographer living and working in New York City. His notable work includes shooting the cover of Lady Gaga’s debut album The Fame, and photographing National Congolese acting out their mythologies in the Congo rainforest for the book Congo Tales published by Prestel Publishing in 2018. He is known for a photographic style that takes inspiration from the 17th century Dutch Golden Age of painting.

Life and career 
Henket was born in Geldrop, Netherlands. He is the son of the Dutch architect Hubert-Jan Henket and the nephew of the Dutch photographer Bertien van Manen. After high school in the Netherlands, Henket moved to the States to take a three-month film course at the New York Film Academy, followed by a documentary-film-making course at the NYU film school. Shortly after, Henket got his start by interning for director Joel Schumacher.

In 1999, he worked on the set of the film Flawless, starring Robert De Niro and Philip Seymour Hoffman. He had a long-time collaboration with recording artist and producer Ryan Leslie. He has worked with celebrities such as Anjelica Huston, Mary-Kate Olsen, Sir Ben Kingsley, Kristen Stewart and Lady Gaga for whose debut album The Fame Henket shot. In 2010, the iconic image was presented at the American Woman exhibition at the Metropolitan Museum of Art in New York.

Congo Tales

In 2015 Henket was commissioned by Tales of Us in Berlin  to photograph Congolese from the Mbomo District acting out their mythologies in the Odzala Kokoua National Park. for the book Congo Tales. It was published by Prestel Publishing (a division of Random House) in the United States on November 15, 2018, and in the UK on July 9th, 2018.

Exhibitions 
 2019, exhibition Congo Tales Museum de Fundatie, Zwolle, The Netherlands
 2018, exhibition, Congo Tales, Museum Barberini, Potsdam, Germany
 2016, exhibition 'Dutch Identity' about Dutch portrait photography, at Museum de Fundatie, Zwolle, Netherlands
 2013, Solo opening exhibition, "The Way I See It" at Museum De Fundatie, Zwolle, Netherlands
 2011, MTV RE:DEFINE’ at the Goss‐Michael Foundation in Dallas
 2011, Exhibited at the Netherlands Film Festival in Stadsschouwburg
 2010, Piece presented in the "American Woman" exhibition at the Metropolitan Museum of Art in New York
 2010, "Fantastic Photography" exhibit at the Noorderlicht Photo Gallery in Groningen

Publications 
 "Congo Tales" (Random House / Prestel, 2018)
 "Stars to the Sun" (Lannoo Publishers/Racine, 2014)
 "The Way I See It" (Uitgeverij De Kunst, 2013)

Further reading
Congo Tales segment and interview on PBS News Hour
Interview with Henket in the New York Times Book Review 
Interview with Henket on National Public Radio
Excerpt of Congo Tales on Public Radio International

References 

 "The Way I See It" at the Museum de Fundatie
 Donated work at the MTV RE:DEFINE event at the Goss-Michael Foundation in Dallas 
 Work in 2011 Netherlands Film Festival
 "Fantastic Photography" exhibit at the Noorderlicht Photo Gallery 
 "Stars to the Sun"
 "The Way I See It" publication at Amazon

External links 
 Pieter Henket Website
 Kahmann Gallery website
 Pieter Henket Vimeo

1979 births
Living people
Dutch photographers
People from Geldrop
Dutch expatriates in the United States